Zarechye is a rural locality (a village) in Pochepsky District, Bryansk Oblast, Russia. The population was 12 as of 2010.

References 

Rural localities in Pochepsky District